The Museo delle Grigne (Museum of Grigna) is the civic museum of Esino Lario in Italy. It preserves and presents to the public a collection of natural history materials including fossils, minerals, representations of phytoclimatic areas of the lake, dioramas of animals, and a collection of Italian butterflies, as well as archaeological and ethno-anthropological artifacts.

History 
The Museo delle Grigne is the first local museum in Province of Como, created in the 1930s by the priest, Giovanni Battista Rocca, in order to let the public know the peculiarities of the territory.

Buildings 
The museum is divided into two buildings, the new seat in Villa Clotilde garden (inaugurated in April 2016) and a space on the first floor of Villa Clotilde.

Administration 
The Museo delle Grigne has been managed by the Associazione Amici del Museo delle Grigne Onlus since 1990. It is part of the museum system of the Province of Lecco.

References

External links 

 Official website

Museums in Lombardy
Culture in Lombardy